Kelif Sanctuary is a wildlife sanctuary (zakaznik) in Turkmenistan.

It is part of Köýtendag Nature Reserve. It was established for the protection of natural complex, creation of favorable conditions for wintering of migrant and natatorial birds.

External links
 https://web.archive.org/web/20090609072344/http://natureprotection.gov.tm/reserve_tm.html

Sanctuaries in Turkmenistan